Paul Gauthier is the name of:

 Paul Gauthier (theologian) (1914–2002), French theologian and humanist
 Paul Gauthier (ice hockey) (1915–1984), ice hockey player
 Paul Gauthier (politician) (1901–1957), Canadian politician
 Paul Gauthier (Inktomi), co-founder of Inktomi Corporation
 Paul Gauthier (boccia), Canadian boccia player

See also
 Jean-Paul Gaultier (born 1952), French fashion designer